Kavitakusumavali was the first poetry magazine published in Dhaka in what is today Bangladesh.

History
Kavitakusumavali was established in May 1860. Krishna Chandra Majumder was the first editor of the magazine. Harish Chandra Mitra and Prasannakumar Sen were the other founding editors. The magazine was sold for one and half anna. The magazine continued to be published till 1872. It had 400 subscribers.

References

1860 establishments in India
Cultural magazines
Defunct literary magazines
Defunct magazines published in Bangladesh
English-language magazines
Magazines disestablished in 1860
Magazines established in 1872
Mass media in Dhaka
 
Poetry literary magazines